Satala is one of Pago Pago’s constituent villages and is located in Pago Pago Bay on Tutuila Island. Satala is in Maoputasi County in the Eastern District of the island. It is home to the historic Satala Cemetery, which is listed on the U.S. National Register of Historic Places, and the government-owned Ronald Reagan Marina Railway Shipyard.

It is also the location of the Satala Power Plant on the northwest coast of Pago Pago Harbor, which previously generated all of the power for Tutuila Island. It is located directly across the street from the coast. American Samoa Power Authority, which operates the ASPA Satala Power Plant, is a non-profit semi-autonomous government agency. The power plant itself is a 13,215 sq. ft. structure on Satala's shoreline. It was the primary power source for the shipyard, the industrial areas on the waterfront, and the power grid on the eastern end of Tutuila. After the 2009 tsunami, sea-water entered the building and eventually submerged it and all its equipment in saltwater. The power capacity was lost as a consequence of the damages.

Satala was the location of BFK, Inc. and where they constructed the Kneubuhl Warehouse near the docks, in order to offload cargo as the sole agent for Matson Shipping Lines. In the 1960s, it became the site of the Pacifica Foods processing plant. Paradise Pizza is a restaurant in Satala, located on the opposite side of the road from StarKist Tuna. It serves American-style pizzas with Samoan pork, taro, tuna, as well as standard ingredients.

As of the 2010 U.S. Census, Satala was home to 61 housing units and 297 residents, up from 162 residents as of 1950.

History
The new Marina Railway at Satala, built to service ships up to 800 tons and aimed at servicing the fast-growing Oriental fishing fleets, opened in 1968.

As the Satala Power Plant was destroyed by the 2009 tsunami, a new power plant was built and dedicated in May 2017. The new plant is quieter and located on higher ground than the previous plant. The multimillion-dollar project had a total cost of $56 million and three funding sources: $36.5 million from the U.S. Federal Emergency Management Agency (FEMA), $17.5 million from insurance proceeds, and $2.5 million from the American Samoa Power Authority (ASPA).

Ronald Reagan Shipyard underwent four months of repairs in 2018, funded with $1 million from federal Capital Improvement Project monies. The repairs came after “30-plus years of the slipway being neglected”, according to American Samoa Shipyard Service Authority CEO Moefa’auo Bill Emmsley. The improvements were designed to alleviate bigger vessels from having to travel afar for required repairs.

See also
Satala Cemetery
American Samoa Power Authority
Ronald Reagan Shipyard

References

Tutuila
Villages in American Samoa